Chehel Tokhm may refer to:
 Chehel Tokhm, Bam
 Chehel Tokhm, Narmashir